Gabino is also the main leader of the National Liberation Army (Colombia).

Gąbino , is a village in the administrative district of Gmina Ustka, within Słupsk County, Pomeranian Voivodeship, in northern Poland.

For the history of the region, see History of Pomerania.

The village has a population of 380.

References

External links

Villages in Słupsk County